Monacha cantiana, common name the "Kentish snail" or "Kentish garden snail", is a species of medium-sized air-breathing land snail, a terrestrial pulmonate gastropod mollusk in the family Hygromiidae, the hairy snails and their allies.

Distribution

This species is known to occur in European countries and islands including:
 Great Britain, England
 France
 Italy
 Belgium
 Netherlands
 Germany
 Czech Republic - non-indigenous in Bohemia since 2009

Africa:
 Egypt

Life cycle
The size of the egg is 1.8 mm.

References

External links
 Two images of a mating pair

Hygromiidae
Gastropods described in 1803